Xing (Chinese: 邢) is a Chinese surname.  There are two hypothesized sources for the extant catalogue of surnames:

1. According to the Yuanhe Xing Zuan, Xing is originated from Ji (姬), the royal family of Zhou Dynasty in China.  The fourth son of the Duke of Zhou, was appointed the ruler of the State of Xing (now Xingtai city of Hebei Province).  The year 662 BC saw the State of Xing taken over by the State of Wei, and the noble descendants entitled themselves their former state name as their surnames.

2. According to Xing Kao (:zh:姓考), or Surname Investigation, in the Spring and Autumn period, Dafu (zh:大夫) Han Xuanzi of the State of Jin, along with his family and offspring resided in Xing county (now east of Wen county of Henan Province), and later his descendants had the surname Xing after the county name.

Notable people
 Xing Yong (died 223), official of the state of Cao Wei in the Three Kingdoms period
 Xing Wenwei (died 690?), Tang Dynasty official under Emperor Ruizong
 Xing Rongjie (1911–1997), People's Liberation Army general
 Xing Qiyi (1911–2002), Chinese organic chemist
 Xing Chongzhi (1927–2000), Chinese politician
 Leonard Hsing Yin Shean (1956–2021), Malaysian politician, former Member of Parliament
 Michael Ying (born 1949), Hong Kong billionaire, former chairman of Esprit Holdings
 Margaret Heng (born 1961), Singaporean hotelier
 Joseph Xing Wenzhi (born 1963), Chinese Roman Catholic auxiliary bishop in the Diocese of Shanghai
 Xing Aihua (born 1978), Chinese long-track speed skater
 Xing Lin (born 1979), Chinese triathlete
 Xing Aowei (born 1982), Chinese gymnast
 Alfred Hsing (born 1983), American martial artist, actor, and stuntman
 Xing Yan'an (born 1983), Chinese sprinter
 Xing Huina (born 1984), Chinese middle-distance runner
 Xing Shucai (born 1984), Chinese race walker
 Nadia Min Dern Heng (born 1985), Malaysian beauty pageant winner
 Yan Dong Xing (born 1985), Chinese racing cyclist
 Xing Aiying (born 1989), Chinese-born Singaporean badminton player
 Xing Yu (archer) (born 1991), Chinese archer
 Ariel Hsing (born 1995), American table tennis player
 Xing Yu (footballer) (born 1996), Chinese football goalkeeper (Chinese Super League)
 Eric Xing, researcher in machine learning, computational biology, and statistical methodology at Carnegie Mellon University
Seing Koo Wan (Singaporean taxi driver and murder victim

External links
 Origination of Xing (邢)

Chinese-language surnames
Individual Chinese surnames